Mainanbar Bundeena Bus Service is an Australian bus company operating services in southern Sydney.

History
In April 1953 SM Allison commenced operating route 64 Bundeena Wharf - Bonnie Vale Camping Ground. After passing through a number of owners, the business was purchased by Peter Leahy in 1983. This was followed in 1989 by Bundeena Bus Service being purchased from Western Road Liners.

Routes
They operate bus route 989 for local bus services between Maianbar and Bundeena on school days only. In addition there is one return trip every Wednesday to Engadine and one return trip every Friday to Miranda both from Bundeena via Maianbar and through the Royal National Park. Since 2005 Bundeena Bus' services have been part of Sydney Bus Region 11, now Region 10.

Fleet
As of July 2022, the fleet consists of 14 buses.

References

Bus companies of New South Wales
Bus transport in Sydney
Transport companies established in 1953
1953 establishments in Australia
Sutherland Shire